Paul Williams (born 22 April 1983) is a New Zealand-born Samoan international rugby union player who plays for Stade Français in the French Top 14. His regular playing positions are Centre, Wing and fullback. He is a son of former All Black Bryan Williams and the brother of Gavin Williams, who plays internationally for Samoa and for French club Clermont.

Playing career

New Zealand
Williams was born 22 April 1983 in Auckland, New Zealand.

As one of the most promising young players in New Zealand rugby, Williams was signed by the Highlanders for the 2003 season, aged only 19 and having never played NPC rugby. He quickly showed his ability, earning the starting job at fullback and scoring his first Super Rugby try before suffering a broken leg in his 6th appearance for the side. Williams' broken leg would turn into a nightmare, as it failed to heal properly and required multiple operations, including a re-breaking of the bone in 2004. He was provisionally named in the Highlanders squad for the 2004 season and again for the 2006 season, but dropped out before each season when it became obvious he wasn't fully recovered.

Finally healthy in 2006, Williams signed for Canterbury and made 4 appearances in the 2006 Air New Zealand Cup, which were his first competitive games in over three years. Despite the limited game action, he was signed by the Crusaders for the 2007 season, although he didn't see any game action. Back with Canterbury for the 2007 Air New Zealand Cup, Williams appeared in every match – mainly on the wing – and impressed with his solid performances. This saw him re-signed by the Highlanders for the 2008 season, where he started all 13 matches and earned All Black consideration for his strong play at fullback. He played for Canterbury in the 2008 Air New Zealand Cup, where his excellent form continued as he scored 6 tries in helping his side to the title.

In 2009 Williams returned to his hometown of Auckland. He spent the 2009 season and 2010 season with the Auckland Blues, where he was a consistent player. However, he played off the bench as often as he started. He also played for Auckland in the 2009 Air New Zealand Cup, and he was named Auckland player of the year in 2009.

Europe

After declaring for Samoa internationally in 2010, Williams signed with the Sale Sharks of the Aviva Premiership for the 2010–11 season. Williams was a regular starter for the Sharks at fullback, scoring 2 tries in 20 appearances. However, he chose to leave Sale after only one season to sign in France with Stade Français for the 2010–11 season.

International career

In May 2008 Williams gained selection for a New Zealand training squad for the 2008 international season, however he never played for the All Blacks.

Williams was eligible to play for Samoa internationally as he spent much of his childhood in the country while his father was coaching the Samoan national team. Unlikely to make the All Blacks squad for the 2011 Rugby World Cup, he declared his intention to play for Samoa in 2010 and made his debut against Tonga in the 2010 IRB Pacific Nations Cup on 12 June.

References

External links
Blues Profile
All Blacks initial training Squad
Timeline of Williams' injury layoff

1983 births
New Zealand rugby union players
New Zealand sportspeople of Cook Island descent
New Zealand sportspeople of Samoan descent
Samoa international rugby union players
Auckland rugby union players
Blues (Super Rugby) players
Highlanders (rugby union) players
Crusaders (rugby union) players
Canterbury rugby union players
Sale Sharks players
Stade Français players
Rugby union fullbacks
New Zealand expatriate rugby union players
Expatriate rugby union players in England
Expatriate rugby union players in France
New Zealand expatriate sportspeople in England
New Zealand expatriate sportspeople in France
Rugby union players from Auckland
Living people
Ponsonby RFC players
People educated at Mount Albert Grammar School
Auckland University of Technology alumni